North Carolina Highway 45 (NC 45) is a primary state highway in the U.S. state of North Carolina. The highway traverses north-south, from Ocracoke to Winton.

Route description

NC 45 starts at the ferry terminal at Ocracoke, connecting with NC 12, it traverses across the Pamlico Sound along the Swan Quarter-Ocracoke Ferry. At Swan Quarter, it continues at a northwesterly direction; merging with several highways along the way, including US 264, NC 99, NC 32, US 64, NC 308, and NC 461. North of Plymouth, it parallels west of the Chowan River before reaching its northern terminus at US 13/US 158, near Winton.

History

On May 1, 2013, NC 45 was extended south from Swan Quarter to its current southern terminus in Ocracoke, crossing over the Pamlico Sound along the Swan Quarter-Ocracoke Ferry. NC 45 does not traverse beyond the ferry terminal.

Major intersections

See also
 North Carolina Bicycle Route 2 - concurrent with NC 45 from Swan Quarter to the northern US 264 intersection

References

External links

045
Transportation in Hyde County, North Carolina
Transportation in Beaufort County, North Carolina
Transportation in Washington County, North Carolina
Transportation in Bertie County, North Carolina
Transportation in Hertford County, North Carolina